Garra kimini is a species of ray-finned fish in the genus Garra, endemic to the Ranga River drainage in India.

References 

Garra
Fish described in 2013